Colorado's 3rd congressional district is a congressional district in the U.S. state of Colorado. It takes in most of the rural Western Slope in the state's western third portion, with a tendril in the south taking in some of the southern portions of the Eastern Plains. It includes the cities of Grand Junction, Durango, Aspen, Glenwood Springs, Ignacio, and Pueblo. The district is currently represented by Republican Lauren Boebert.

The district was represented from 1987 to 1993 by Ben Nighthorse Campbell before he ran for the U.S. Senate and switched parties from Democratic to Republican. The district's former representative Scott R. Tipton lost renomination in 2020 to the more conservative Boebert in what was considered a major upset. Boebert went on to win the general election on November 3, 2020, and assumed office on January 3, 2021.

The district is mainly rural and leans Republican, though not as much as the neighboring 4th district. However, the Democrats have a strong base in counties on the I-70 corridor and Pueblo, as well as liberal ski towns such as Aspen, thus keeping the seat somewhat competitive.

History

1990s

Following the 1990 U.S. census and associated realignment of Colorado congressional districts, the 3rd congressional district consisted of Alamosa, Archuleta, Chaffee, Conejos, Costilla, Custer, Delta, Dolores, Eagle, Garfield, Grand, Gunnison, Hinsdale, Huerfano, Jackson, Lake, La Plata, Mesa, Mineral, Moffat, Montezuma, Montrose, Ouray, Park, Pitkin, Pueblo, Rio Blanco, Rio Grande, Routt, Saguache, San Juan, San Miguel, and Summit counties, as well as portions of Douglas, Fremont, and Jefferson counties.

2000s

Following the 2000 U.S. census and associated realignment of Colorado congressional districts, the 3rd congressional district consisted of Alamosa, Archuleta, Conejos, Costilla, Custer, Delta, Dolores, Garfield, Gunnison, Hinsdale, Huerfano, Jackson, La Plata, Las Animas, Mesa, Mineral, Moffat, Montezuma, Montrose, Ouray, Pitkin, Pueblo, Rio Blanco, Rio Grande, Routt, Saguache, San Juan, and San Miguel counties and most of Otero County.

2010s

Following the 2010 U.S. census and associated realignment of Colorado congressional districts, the 3rd congressional district underwent very little change, and continued to cover 27 of the previous counties, excluding Las Animas and Otero counties.

2020s

Following the 2020 U.S. census and associated realignment of Colorado congressional districts, the 3rd congressional district lost Jackson County, Routt County, and most of Eagle County to the 2nd district as well as Custer and Lake counties to the 7th district. It also gained Las Animas and Otero counties from the 4th district. This configuration of the district took effect starting from the 2022 elections.

Characteristics
The district has two major population centers in Grand Junction and Pueblo. The two cities and their surrounding rural areas provide a competitive arena for congressional races. Grand Junction, on the Western Slope, is a Republican stronghold, while Pueblo, a town with a large Latino population and (by Colorado norms) a heavily unionized workforce, provides a base of support for Democrats.

The Denver Post describes the district as such: 

|}

List of members representing the district

Election results

1914

1916

1918

1920

1922

1924

1926

1928

1930

1932

1934

1936

1938

1940 (Special)

1940

1942

1944

1946

1948

1950

1952

1954

1956

1958

1960

1962

1964

1966

1968

1970

1972

1974

1976

1978

1980

1982

1984

1986

1988

1990

1992

1994

1996

1998

2000

2002

2004

2006

2008

2010

2012

2014

2016

2018

2020

2022

Historical district boundaries

See also

Colorado's congressional districts
List of United States congressional districts

References

 Congressional Biographical Directory of the United States 1774–present

3
Colorado Western Slope
San Luis Valley of Colorado